Botvid is a Swedish given name and surname.

People with the name include:

Given name 
 Saint Botvid (died 1120), Christian missionary in Sweden
 Botvid Sunesson (died 1562), Swedish prelate

Surname 
 John Botvid (1889–1964), Swedish actor and comedian
 Rolf Botvid (1915–1998), Swedish actor and writer

Swedish masculine given names
Swedish-language surnames